PKT may refer to:
 Propadu Konair Tarahubun, fertilizer manufacturer, Indonesia
 Park Street railway station, England, National Rail station code
 PKT machine gun
 Pakistan Standard Time
 Bontang PKT, Indonesian football team
 Port Keats Airfield, IATA airport code "PKT"